Brian Blanchard (born November 7, 1958) is an American attorney, judge, and Democratic politician.  He currently serves as a judge of the Wisconsin Court of Appeals in Madison-based District IV.

Biography
Born in State College, Pennsylvania, Judge Brian W. Blanchard graduated from the University of Michigan with honors and from the Northwestern University School of Law, where he was Editor-In-Chief of the Northwestern Law Review. Blanchard is married to Mary Blanchard and has three children; Will, Ben, and Allison.

Career
Blanchard was an Assistant United States Attorney in Chicago, Illinois, from 1990 to 1997. In 1997, he moved to Madison, Wisconsin and joined a private practice. He later became district attorney of Dane County, Wisconsin, and served in that position from 2001 until his election to the Court of Appeals in 2010.

Electoral history

| colspan="6" style="text-align:center;background-color: #e9e9e9;"| General Election, April 6, 2010

References

1958 births
Living people
Assistant United States Attorneys
District attorneys in Wisconsin
Lawyers from Madison, Wisconsin
Northwestern University Pritzker School of Law alumni
People from State College, Pennsylvania
Politicians from Madison, Wisconsin
University of Michigan alumni
Wisconsin Court of Appeals judges
21st-century American judges